Pita Biri Rabo (born 30 July 1977), is a Fijian footballer who plays as a forward for Fijian National Football League side Suva. As well as being club captain, Rabo is also a coach for the Suva-based club.

Club career
Rabo joined Palmerston North-based side Manawatu United ahead of the 2011–12 season, but left in December 2011, citing personal reasons. He returned to Wairarapa United, but did not stay long, joining Suva F.C. for the 2013 season.

Career statistics

International

International goals
Scores and results list Fiji's goal tally first.

References

External links
 
 
 Pita Rabo at FIFA

1977 births
Living people
Association football forwards
Rewa F.C. players
Suva F.C. players
Fijian footballers
Fiji international footballers
1998 OFC Nations Cup players
2004 OFC Nations Cup players
2008 OFC Nations Cup players